In enzymology, an UTP—xylose-1-phosphate uridylyltransferase is an enzyme that catalyzes the chemical reaction

UTP + alpha-D-xylose 1-phosphate  diphosphate + UDP-xylose

Thus, the two substrates of this enzyme are UTP and alpha-D-xylose 1-phosphate, whereas its two products are diphosphate and UDP-xylose.

This enzyme belongs to the family of transferases, specifically those transferring phosphorus-containing nucleotide groups (nucleotidyltransferases).  The systematic name of this enzyme class is UTP:alpha-D-xylose-1-phosphate uridylyltransferase. Other names in common use include xylose-1-phosphate uridylyltransferase, uridylyltransferase, xylose 1-phosphate, UDP-xylose pyrophosphorylase, uridine diphosphoxylose pyrophosphorylase, and xylose 1-phosphate uridylyltransferase.  This enzyme participates in nucleotide sugars metabolism.

References

 

EC 2.7.7
Enzymes of unknown structure